Roomful of Teeth is a vocal ensemble founded in 2009 by Brad Wells. Its stated mission is to "mine the expressive potential of the human voice".

The ensemble gathers annually at the Massachusetts Museum of Contemporary Art (Mass MoCA), where they have studied Tuvan throat singing, yodeling, belting, Inuit throat singing, Korean p’ansori, Georgian singing, Sardinian cantu a tenore, Hindustani music, and Persian classical singing with some of the world’s top performers and teachers of the styles. Commissioned composers include Elena Ruehr, Christine Southworth & Evan Ziporyn, Rinde Eckert, Judd Greenstein, Caleb Burhans, Merrill Garbus (of tUnE-yArDs), William Brittelle, Sarah Kirkland Snider, Missy Mazzoli, Sam Amidon, Michael Harrison, Ted Hearne, and 2015 Pulitzer Prize recipient Julia Wolfe.

Roomful of Teeth have performed at various venues, including Merkin Hall, (Le) Poisson Rouge, Town Hall (Seattle), the Carlsbad Music Festival (California), Fusebox Festival, MIT Sounding, and the Lincoln Center. The group regularly leads vocal technique workshops, master classes, improv-based workshops, and concerts at colleges, elementary schools, high schools, and community centers across the United States. In August 2014, Roomful of Teeth was spotlighted at the International Federation for Choral Music symposium in Seoul, Korea (one of only three American vocal ensembles invited).

The project's debut album, Roomful of Teeth, was released in 2012 and nominated in three categories for the 2014 56th Annual Grammy Awards, including Best Engineer for Classical Album, Best Chamber Music/Small Ensemble Performance, and Best Contemporary Classical Composition. The album subsequently received a Grammy for Best Chamber Music/Small Ensemble Performance.

In April 2013, ensemble member Caroline Shaw received the Pulitzer Prize for Music for Partita for 8 Voices, the four movements of which appear on the group’s debut album.  An iTunes exclusive EP of Partita was subsequently released and ranked no. 1 on iTunes Classical charts.

Roomful of Teeth’s second full-length recording, Render, was released in April 2015, and featured works by Wally Gunn, Missy Mazzoli, William Brittelle, Caleb Burhans, ensemble tenor Eric Dudley, and artistic director Brad Wells.

In October 2019, the band was the subject of a controversy on Instagram and Twitter when several performers of Inuit throat singing, including Canadian Inuk throat singer Tanya Tagaq, accused Caroline Shaw and Roomful of Teeth of having engaged in cultural appropriation and exoticism for their use of throat singing without sufficiently crediting or compensating the creators of that intellectual property, in particular in regards to the ensemble's signature work, Partita for 8 Voices. As a result of this criticism, the ensemble agreed to make a number of changes in how they approached source materials, including more prominently crediting teachers and coaches, reading a source acknowledgment statement before performances, and exploring other ways to support the work of indigenous musicians.

Discography
Studio albums
 Roomful of Teeth (2012)
 Render (2015)
 3 (2019)

EPs
 Caroline Shaw: Partita for 8 Voices (2013)
 Caroline Shaw: Partita for 8 Voices (Remixes) (2016)
 Michael Harrison: Just Constellations (2020)

Other albums
 The Colorado: Music from the Motion Picture (2016)
 Berio: Sinfonia - Boulez: Notations I–IV - Ravel: La valse, M.72 (2018)
 Wally Gunn: The Ascendant'' (2020)

Singles
 "May the Angels" (2019)
 "The Chair" (2019)
 "Coloring Book: No. 5, Your People" (2019)

References

External links
 
 Bandcamp website for debut, self-titled album
 Bandcamp page for sophomore album, Render

Choirs in Massachusetts
Grammy Award winners
Musical groups established in 2009
2009 establishments in Massachusetts